Astreopora is a genus of stony corals in the Acroporidae family. Members of the genus are commonly known as star corals and there are seventeen species currently recognized.

Description
Members of this genus mostly form dome-shaped or rounded heads but sometimes have leaflike extensions, be encrusting or form plates, vases and branches. They are much larger than members of the genus Montipora. They have a wide range of colours including yellow, brown, green, pink and blue but the most common are whitish-blue. The corallites are distinct and separate, sometimes raised on cones and sometimes depressed, up to four millimetres across and round in cross-section. The skeleton is porous with the coenosteum having a net-like appearance. The coral appears rough-textured because of tiny spines that cover the surface between the corallites. The septa are poorly developed giving corals of this genus the appearance of being filled with holes.

Distribution
Members of this genus occur in the Red Sea, the Indian Ocean and the western Pacific. They are widespread but not particularly common and are a reef building species. They are found in a range of environments including shallow or muddy waters, as well as deeper areas of the reef where plating forms are most common. In shallow water they are inconspicuous and are never dominant. They may form heads of up to two metres in diameter and in deeper waters they may be much more common.

Ecology
The porous skeleton of these corals provide a home to a variety of polychaete worms that weaken the calcium carbonate structure by tunnelling into it.

Several species of coral-inhabiting barnacles are associated with Astreopora. In fact, Hiroa stubbingsi and two species of Cionophorus seem to occur nowhere else. In the case of H. stubbingsi, which has a  primitive wall and a relatively unspecialised operculum, this may be because it is not equipped to occupy other corals, but the Cionophorus species are smaller and it is an enigma why they are not found elsewhere.

Species
Known species include:

 Astreopora acroporina Wallace, Turak & DeVantier, 2011
 Astreopora cenderawasih Wallace, Turak & DeVantier, 2011
 Astreopora cucullata Lamberts, 1980
 Astreopora expansa Brüggemann, 1877
 Astreopora explanata Veron, 1985
 Astreopora gracilis Bernard, 1896
 Astreopora incrustans Bernard, 1896
 Astreopora lambertsi Moll and Best, 1984
 Astreopora listeri Bernard, 1896
 Astreopora macrostoma Veron and Wallace, 1984
 Astreopora monteporina Wallace, Turak & DeVantier, 2011
 Astreopora moretonensis Veron and Wallace, 1984
 Astreopora myriophthalma  (Lamarck, 1816)
 Astreopora ocellata Bernard, 1896
 Astreopora randalli Lamberts, 1980
 Astreopora scabra Lamberts, 1982
 Astreopora suggesta Wells, 1954

References

Acroporidae
Cnidarians of the Indian Ocean
Cnidarians of the Pacific Ocean
Fauna of the Red Sea
Marine fauna of Oceania
Taxa named by Henri Marie Ducrotay de Blainville